MS Sea Diamond was a cruise ship operated by Louis Hellenic Cruise Lines. She was built in 1984 by Valmet, Finland for Birka Line as Birka Princess. The ship ran aground near the Greek island of Santorini 5 April 2007, and sank the next day leaving two passengers missing and presumed dead.

History
Originally named Birka Princess, the ship was built by the Finnish state-owned company Valmet at their Vuosaari shipyard in Helsinki at a cost of 350 million Finnish markka (€58,9 million). She was delivered in 1986 and operated for Birka Line in the Baltic Sea cruiseferry market, sailing on 24-hour cruises between Stockholm in Sweden and Åland in Finland. Between 1990 and 2003 she also made longer cruises around the Baltic Sea during the summer season.

Between 1992 and 2002, the ship's exterior was used to portray the fictional ship MS Freja in the Swedish TV soap opera Rederiet.

As built, she had a small car deck, with space for 80 passenger cars and a ramp on the port side in the rear. Like most cruiseferries in the Baltic Sea, she was built to ice class 1A.

In 1999 she was extensively refitted at Lloyd Werft in Germany at a cost of approximately US$26 million. The fore superstructure was extended and streamlined and 62 new passenger cabins were added, including a new deck of cabins above the bridge. In October 2004, when the new MS Birka Paradise was delivered, the Birka Princess started making two-night cruises from Stockholm to Turku, Helsinki and Tallinn, as well one weekly 24-hour cruise from Stockholm to Mariehamn. The new itineraries proved largely unsuccessful, and on 2 January 2006, the ship was laid up in Mariehamn and put up for sale.

In February 2006 she was sold to the Cyprus-based Louis Cruise Lines for US$35 million (€29.4 million). As built, the ship only had an indoor pool in the sauna section on deck 2 in the bow of the ship. A new outdoor swimming pool was installed and the sundeck area increased at Turku Repair Yard, Naantali. She entered service in the Mediterranean Sea as the second former Birka Line ship in the Louis Cruise Lines fleet, after MS Princesa Marissa, the former MS Prinsessan/Finnhansa. After the sale she was registered in Valletta, Malta. She changed flags in late 2006. At the time of her sinking she was owned by Elona Maritime Ltd, a company based in Malta, but registered at Piraeus, Greece.

Artwork on the ship included two reliefs by ceramic artist Åsa Hellman.

Sinking

On 5 April 2007, at around 16:00 EEST (13:00 UTC) the ship ran aground on a well-marked volcanic reef east of Nea Kameni, within the caldera of the Greek island of Santorini, began taking on water, and listed up to 12 degrees to starboard before her watertight doors were reportedly closed (a report which was later refuted when the wreck was examined). The 1,153 passengers, mostly Americans and 60 Canadians, were initially all reported to be safely evacuated in three-and-a-half hours, with four injuries. Some passengers, including a group of 77 students from Paisley Magnet School in North Carolina, were evacuated from the car ramp through the former car deck onto boats, but some passengers had to climb down rope ladders from the higher decks. The ship was towed off the rocks, and her list stabilized. Later, it was reported that two French passengers were missing.

The large amount of water taken on board led to the ship sinking shortly before 7:00 EEST on 6 April 2007, only a few hundred metres from the shore.
Video footage shows that, toward the end, the ship completely capsized before settling stern first onto the sea floor. It was later reported that the tip of the bulbous bow was only 62 metres (203 feet) below sea level, but the stern was in water up to 180 metres (590 feet) deep. It is feared that the wreck would soon slide deeper and sink into the submerged caldera of the volcanic island.
It has been speculated that the deep, almost vertical shore of the bathtub-like caldera made it impossible to beach the ship and save her from becoming a total loss.

Missing
Two French citizens, Jean Christophe Allain, aged 45, and his daughter Maud, 16, were listed as missing. Allain's wife said her cabin filled with water when the ship struck rocks and that she narrowly escaped. She was not sure whether her husband and daughter made it out because the events happened so suddenly. Her son was on deck at the time and was evacuated safely. The family were accommodated in cabin 2014, an outside standard cabin on the starboard side of the vessel on deck 2, the lowest passenger deck.

Divers examined the wreck on 6 April to gather information on the ship's current position and to seek the missing passengers but the search of the cabin recovered nothing. Divers continued searching on 10 April, but nothing was reported. Later in the same day, local governors apologized to the French family for their missing relatives. The black box containing the recordings of the conversations before the crash was discovered on 15 April, while the bodies of the two missing persons were never found.

Investigations
On 7 April, Greek authorities announced that they were charging the captain and five other officers with negligence. State television reported they were charged with causing a shipwreck through negligence, breaching international shipping safety regulations and polluting the environment. Additional charges could be made depending on the fate of the two missing passengers. All six were released until further notice but if convicted they could face a five-year prison sentence.

On 13 April 2007, it was reported that investigators using a remotely controlled submarine found the ship's data recorder (VDR). In a struggle to protect the data, they secured it in a special sterilized bin and the authorities were to have transferred it to the United States in order to reveal the saved data, an action that only the manufacturer of the VDR can perform. The Greek Merchant Marine Ministry said the recorder could reveal details of the sinking of the ship which could be used in the prosecution of crew members.

DNV, one of the world's leading classification agencies, stated in their press release that "At the time of the accident, DNV had issued class certificate, safety management certificate and ship security certificate. Sea Diamond had no overdue surveys and no condition of class". For the Sea Diamond to have been issued a Class certificate, her water-tight doors would have to have been fully operational.

Investigations carried out by the defense team of the Master of the Vessel and Louis Cruise Lines, after a lawsuit had been filed against them, have included a new hydrographic survey of the area of the accident in Santorini. This survey was carried out by Akti Engineering, and discovered discrepancies between the actual mapping of the sea area and the official charts used by the Sea Diamond (and all other vessels) at the time of the accident.

The findings obtained by Akti Engineering have since been passed on to the Hellenic Hydrographic Office of the Hellenic Navy and other responsible authorities, with the aim that the necessary changes to maritime charts should be made and similar accidents to be prevented. According to a branch reviewing source, the Hellenic Hydrographic Office initially rejected the new mapping, but a later study confirmed the findings of Akti.

A Greek scuba diver gathering evidence for a judicial investigation of the Sea Diamond shipwreck died in October 2007 from decompression sickness after ascending too quickly.

Aftermath
As of 20 September 2007, fuel had started to leak into other parts of the ship, but not yet into the surrounding environment. In June 2009, some of the fuel was pumped off the wreck.
On 14 May 2007, it was announced that Louis Cruise Lines had bought M/S Silja Opera (renaming it M/S Cristal) to replace the Sea Diamond.

On 19 June 2007, the owners, operator and captain of the Sea Diamond cruise ship were fined €1.17 million for causing marine pollution.

On 21 August 2007, a lawsuit was filed in United States federal court on behalf of the passengers who were aboard the ship when she sank.

After six years in the courts, the Sea Diamond captain and an insurance company employee were given 12- and 8-year jail sentences, respectively.

Raising
After the sinking there was much demand from the residents of Santorini for the wreck be raised and removed. Further questions were posed but never answered as to why the ship was moved to deeper water to be allowed to sink in the first place. In May 2011, the Greek government claimed that removing the Sea Diamond would be "too costly" and said that the 150-million-euro cost of raising the ship should be the responsibility of the insurers and company that owned the ship. The latter two have no plans to raise the ship, however.

In October 2017 the Merchant Marine Ministry of Greece announced the wreck will be raised, out of environmental and navigational concerns. It is an artificial reef for now.

Images from Birka Princess 
Images from Birka Princess taken one week after her maiden voyage in April 1986

See also

 Lists of ship and ferry disasters
 Lists of shipwrecks
 Costa Concordia, an Italian cruise ship which grounded and capsized in January 2012, killing at least 32 people
 SS Heraklion, a Greek car ferry which capsized and sank in the Aegean Sea in 1966.
 MS Mikhail Lermontov, a Soviet cruise ship which ran aground on well-charted rocks and subsequently sank in the Marlborough Sounds, New Zealand, in 1986 under similar circumstances to the Sea Diamond.
 MS Express Samina, a Greek car ferry which hit a pair of rocky islets and sank near the Cyclades island of Paros in 2000.

References

External links

 The cruise vessel Sea Diamond
 Cruise Liner Sunk in Santorini 
 Ship Profile
 New Twist in Sea Diamond Sinking?
 Το ναυάγιο του MS Sea Diamond - MARINEWS

Amateur video and photos 
 Videos by member of student group
 View from island: April 5 2007 evacuation, April 6 2007 sinking
 Pictures taken by a passenger during evacuation
 Amateur photos before the incident
 Two short video clips of Birka Princess

2007 in Greece
Ships of Celestyal Cruises
Cruise ships of Finland
Cruise ships of Greece
Maritime incidents in 2007
Ships built in Helsinki
Maritime incidents in Greece
Shipwrecks in the Aegean Sea
1985 ships
Valmet
Sunken cruise ships